Abdur Rahim Boxi is an Indian politician belonging to All India Trinamool Congress. He was elected as a member of West Bengal Legislative Assembly from Malatipur in 2021. He joined All India Trinamool Congress from Revolutionary Socialist Party on 11 January 2019. He is also a District President of Malda district TMC.

References

Living people
Trinamool Congress politicians from West Bengal
West Bengal MLAs 2011–2016
1963 births